Workers' education may refer to:

 Workers' Educational Association
 Workers' Education Bureau of America